Crocker Park is a lifestyle center and mixed-use development in Westlake, Ohio.

History
The $200 million project was developed by Stark Enterprises and The Carney Foundation. It features restaurants, retailers, residential, and entertainment. The project also includes office space.

The first phase opened October 29, 2004. Upon opening, it comprised a lifestyle center featuring Barnes & Noble and Dick's Sporting Goods.

Borders vacated the center in 2011 and was replaced by a Nordstrom Rack in 2013. The final phase, which was completed in 2014, includes a new corporate headquarters for American Greetings. During the construction of the American Greetings headquarters building, on March 10, 2016, a propane tank ignited and exploded, creating a large fireball that towered over buildings and a blast that could be heard from over a mile away. There were no injuries reported, and no cause was determined.

References

External links

2004 establishments in Ohio
Lifestyle centers (retail)
Shopping malls in Cuyahoga County, Ohio
Shopping malls established in 2004
Tourist attractions in Cuyahoga County, Ohio